This is a list of the 250 members of the 13th convocation of the National Assembly of Serbia, as well as a list of former members of this convocation.

The 13th convocation of the National Assembly was elected in the 2022 parliamentary election, and it first met on 1 August 2022.

MPs by party

List of members of the 13th National Assembly

List of former members of the 13th National Assembly

References